USS S-24 (SS-129) was a first-group (S-1 or "Holland") S-class submarine of the United States Navy. During World War II, she also served in the Royal Navy as HMS P555.

Construction and commissioning
S-24′s keel was laid down on 1 November 1918 by the Bethlehem Shipbuilding Corporation's Fore River Shipyard in Quincy, Massachusetts. She was launched on 27 June 1922, sponsored by Mrs. Herbert B. Loper, and commissioned on 24 August 1923 with Lieutenant Commander Louis E. Denfeld in command.

Service history

U.S. Navy

Interwar years
Operating from New London, Connecticut, in 1923 and 1924, S-24 served at Saint Thomas, United States Virgin Islands, in February 1924. She visited Trinidad from 6 to 13 March 1924, the Panama Canal area in April 1924, and Hawaii from 27 April 1924 to May 1925. She served principally at San Diego, San Pedro, and Mare Island, California, until 1930, also serving in the Panama Canal area in February and March 1926, visiting Hawaii in 1927 and 1928, serving in the Panama Canal area  again in February 1929, and making two visits to Hawaii during 1929.

Departing San Diego on 1 December 1930, S-24 arrived at Pearl Harbor, Hawaii, on 12 December 1930. She operated from Pearl Harbor until 15 October 1938, when she got underway for New London, which she reached on 4 January 1939. After serving in commission in reserve with a partial crew at New London from 1 April 1939, S-24 resumed full duty with a full crew on 1 July 1940. She then operated from New London until December 1941.

World War II
After the United States entered World War II with the Japanese attack on Pearl Harbor on 7 December 1941, S-24 served in waters near the Panama Canal from late December 1941 until May 1942. Returning to New London on 21 May 1942, she decommissioned there on 10 August 1942.

Royal Navy
On the day she was decommissioned, S-24 was transferred to the United Kingdom. In the Royal Navy, she was commissioned as HMS P555 in October 1942 and was assigned to the 7th Submarine Flotilla, a flotilla based at Holy Loch, Scotland, used for training new submarine officers and crews and for training surface warships in anti-submarine warfare. Among the officers who commanded her was Royal Naval Volunteer Reserve (RNVR) Lieutenant Edward Preston Young, making P555 the first Royal Navy submarine to be commanded by a British RNVR officer. The Royal Navy decommissioned P555 in May 1944 and returned her to the U.S. Navy in December 1944.

Disposal
After her return, the U.S. Navy struck S-24 from the Navy List. She was scuttled in the English Channel off Portland Bill on 28 April 1947 for use as a sonar target. (or 25 August 1947).

References 

 

United States S-class submarines
Ships built in Quincy, Massachusetts
1922 ships
World War II submarines of the United States
Ships transferred from the United States Navy to the Royal Navy
United States S-class submarines of the Royal Navy
World War II submarines of the United Kingdom
Scuttled vessels
Maritime incidents in 1947